Annabelle Combes is a French writer. She was a marketing manager at Kraft Foods, before taking art history courses at the École du Louvre. 
Her first novel La Grâce de l’éclat de rire (Salvator), won the 2018 Rotary Clubs literary prize. La Calanque de l'Aviateur is her second novel.

References

21st-century French women writers
21st-century French novelists
Living people
Year of birth missing (living people)
Place of birth missing (living people)
Kraft Foods people